Wildflowers is the 2001 debut album by Jonathan Byrd.  The songs are mostly original songs with a few traditional tunes.  Here he mixes contemporary singer-songwriter storytelling with Appalachian folk roots.  There is even a murder ballad; "Velma" is a song about serial killer Velma Barfield whose victims included Byrd's own grandfather.  Sing Out! says, "[Jonathan Byrd's] songwriting melds the lyricism of Celtic music with the stark storytelling of the finest traditional balladeers."

Arthur Wood of Folkwax says that Byrd's "Ashe County Fair" is certain, in time, to become a "folk classic."  Byrd explained to Wood: "When I started writing it, I didn't know the girl was going to die."

Byrd says that he learned to play in the alternate guitar tuning DADGAD during two visits to Ireland: "For a personal challenge, I wrote and recorded my entire first album [this album] in that tuning, bringing it into the Old-Time, Bluegrass, and Country idioms."  The album includes a couple of instrumentals that allow Byrd to show off his flatpicking skills.  Sing Out! described the sound of the album as, "a wonderfully spare collection, allowing the warm expressive vocals of Jonathan and his strong guitar to carry most of the weight of the arrangements." Byrd plays a number of vintage Martin Guitars on the album including a 1936 Martin D-28, a 1937 sunburst D-18, and a 1934 D-18.

Track listing
All songs by Jonathan Byrd except where noted
 "Wildflowers" – 3:29
 "Eli's Cotton Gin" – 3:14
 "Velma" – 3:34
 "Lady's Fancy" (traditional) – 2:13
 "Sandy Mush" – 4:03
 "The Golden Glow of Autumn" – 2:48
 "Tinytown" – 5:30
 "Ashe County Fair" – 5:27
 "Bean an Fhir Rua, Backstep Cindy" (traditional) – 3:27
 "The Sparrow" – 3:01
 "Mama" – 2:26
 "Molly Dear" (traditional) – 3:26
 "Big Hoedown" (traditional) – 1:57
 "The Cider Song" – 3:51
 "Her Eyes Were Green" – 4:16
 "Robena" – 2:48

Personnel

Musicians
 Jonathan Byrd – vocals, guitar
 Tim Stambaugh – tenor vocals
 John Boulding – Dobro, banjo
 Russell Johnson – chop mandolin
 Charles Petee – lead mandolin
 Rex McGee – fiddle (tracks 6 & 7)
 Bill Hicks – fiddle (track 15)
 Robbie Link – bass

Production
 Jerry Brown – co-producer, recording engineer, mastering
Recorded at the Rubber Room in Chapel Hill, North Carolina
Mastered at The Chop Shop in Chapel Hill, North Carolina

Artwork
Hale Dixon Design
John Dixon – Graphic art
Melissanne Hale Dixon – Photography

References

External links
Jonathan Byrd – Wildflowers page at Waterbug Records (sound samples etc.)

2001 albums
Jonathan Byrd (musician) albums